Sune Ralf Bertil Skagerling (September 27, 1919 – November 28, 1997) was a Swedish bobsledder who competed in the 1956 Winter Olympics.

Together with Olle Axelsson, Ebbe Wallén, and Gunnar Åhs he was a crew member of Sweden I who finished 16th in the four-man event.

He was born in Stockholm and died in Tyresö.

External links
1956 bobsleigh four-man results

1919 births
1997 deaths
Swedish male bobsledders
Olympic bobsledders of Sweden
Bobsledders at the 1956 Winter Olympics
Sportspeople from Stockholm
20th-century Swedish people